The Child and Family Agency, known as Tusla, is an independent Irish agency created by the Child and Family Agency Act 2013 and answerable to the Minister for Children, Equality, Disability, Integration and Youth. Its functions were previously distributed among the Health Service Executive's Children & Family Services, the Family Support Agency, and the National Educational Welfare Board.

References

2014 establishments in Ireland
Government agencies established in 2014
Government agencies of the Republic of Ireland
Department of Children, Equality, Disability, Integration and Youth